The 2006 OFC Women's U-20 Championship was the 3rd edition of the OFC U-20 Women's Championship, a biennial international football competition for women's under-20 national teams organised by Oceania Football Confederation. The final tournament was hosted for the first time in Samoa from 31 March–8 April 2006.

Players born on or after 1 January 1986 were eligible to participate in the competition. Holders Australia were not eligible to defend their title after moving into the Asian Football Confederation.

In the final, New Zealand defeated Tonga 6–0. In doing so, the New Zealand team won their first title in this competition, having previously lost the 2002 final to Australia.

By winning the title, New Zealand also qualified for the 2006 FIFA U-20 Women's World Championship in Russia.

Qualification 
All members of the Oceania Football Confederation qualified automatically, however, Cook Islands and Tahiti withdrew before the tournament began.

Participating teams 
The following teams participated in the 2006 OFC U-20 Women's Championship tournament:

1 Bold indicates champion for that year. Italic indicates host for that year.

Venue 
All matches were played at one venue: the Toleafoa JS Blatter Soccer Complex in Apia.

Group stage

Group A

Group B

Knockout stage 
In the knockout stage, extra time and penalty shoot-out were used to decide the winner if necessary.

Bracket

Semi-finals

Third Place Match

Final

Goalscorers 
6 goals

  Kirsty Yallop
  Suitupe Tafafa

5 goals

  Caitlin Campbell
  Ali Riley
  Zeena Limbai

3 goals

  Helen Collins
  Ria Percival
  Jennifer Leo
  Penateti Feke

2 goals

  Savaira Ratu
  Emma Harrison
  Emma Humphries
  Jacqueline Chalau
  Daisy Winas
  Marion Tuipulotu
  Karen Utaatu

1 goal

  Yashreen Begum
  Radalaite Marama
  Hannah Bromley
  Abby Erceg
  Sarah Gregorius
  Renee Leota
  Annalie Longo
  Petria Rennie
  Hannah Rishworth
  Bridget Nakas
  Pauline Turakaura
  Frances Ane
  Josephone Ane
  Florence Lam Sam
  Faavae Taumua
  Vanessa Inifiri
  Layda Samani
  Kaati Malua
  Salome Vaenuku
  Leisoko Masauvakalo
  Fabrice Serveux

Awards 
 FairPlay Award:

References

External links 
 Oceania Football Confederation official website

2006
2006 in women's association football
2006 Ofc U-20 Women's Championship
2005–06 in OFC football
2006 in youth association football